The 1994 James Madison Dukes football team was an American football team that represented James Madison University during the 1994 NCAA Division I-AA football season as a member of the Yankee Conference. In their fourth year under head coach Rip Scherer, the team compiled a 10–3 record.

Schedule

References

James Madison
James Madison Dukes football seasons
James Madison Dukes football